In Hinduism, the tilaka is a mark worn usually on the forehead, at the point of the Ajna chakra, or sometimes another part of the body such as the neck, hand, chest, or the arm. The tilaka may be worn daily or for rites of passage or special spiritual and religious occasions only, depending on regional customs.

The term also refers to the Hindu ritual of marking someone's forehead with a fragrant paste, such as of sandalwood or vermilion, as a welcome and an expression of honour when they arrive.

Description
The tilaka is a mark created by the application of powder or paste on the forehead. Tilakas are vertical markings worn by Vaishnavites (a sect of Hinduism). The Vaishnava tilaka consists of a long vertical marking starting from just below the hairline to almost the end of one's nose tip, and they are also known as Urdhva Pundra. It is intercepted in the middle by an elongated U. There may be two marks on the temples as well. This tilaka is traditionally made with sandalwood paste.

The other major tilaka variant is often worn by the followers of Shiva, known by the names of Rudra-tilaka and Tripundra. It consists of three horizontal bands across the forehead with a single vertical band or circle in the middle. This is traditionally done with sacred ash from fire sacrifices. This variant is the more ancient of the two and shares many common aspects with similar markings worn across the world.
 
Shaktas, worshippers of the various forms of the Goddess (Devi), wear a large red dot of kumkum (vermillion or red turmeric) on the forehead.

Significance
Chapter 2 of the Kalagni Rudra Upanishad, a Shaiva traditional text, explains the three lines of a Tilaka as a reminder of various triads: three sacred fires, three syllables in Om, three gunas, three worlds, three types of atman (self), three powers in oneself, first three Vedas, three times of extraction of the Vedic drink Soma.

The first line is equated to Garhapatya (the sacred fire in a household kitchen), the A syllable of Om, the Rajas guna, the earth, the external self, Kriyā – the power of action, the Rigveda, the morning extraction of Soma, and Maheshvara.
The second streak of ash is a reminder of Dakshinagni (the holy fire lighted in the South for ancestors), the sound U of Om, Sattva guna, the atmosphere, the inner self, Iccha – the power of will, the Yajurveda, midday Soma extraction, and Sadashiva.
The third streak is the Ahavaniya (the fire used for Homa), the M syllable in Om, the Tamas guna, Svarga – heaven, the Paramatman – the highest self (the ultimate reality of Brahman), Jnana – the power of knowledge, the Samaveda, Soma extraction at dusk, and Shiva.

These lines, represent Shiva's threefold power of will (icchāśakti), knowledge (jñānaśakti), and action (kriyāśakti). The Tripuṇḍra described in this and other Shaiva texts also symbolises Shiva's trident (triśūla) and the divine triad of Brahmā, Vishnu, and Shiva.

The Vasudeva Upanishad, a Vaishnava tradition text, similarly explains the significance of three vertical lines in Urdhva Pundra Tilaka to be a reminder of Brahma, Vishnu, Shiva; the Vedic scriptures – Rigveda, Yajurveda and Samaveda; three worlds Bhu, Bhuva, Svar; the three syllables of Om – A, U, M; three states of consciousness – awake, dream sleep, deep sleep; three realities – Maya, Brahman and Atman; the three bodies – Sthula, Sukshma, and Karana.

Traditions

Different Hindu traditions use different materials and shapes to make the tilaka.

Shaivites typically mark their Tilak using vibhuti (ash) in three horizontal lines across the forehead. Along with the three horizontal lines, a bindu of sandalwood paste or a dot of red kumkum in the centre completes the Tilaka (tripundra).
Vaishnavas apply a Tilak with vermillion, clay, sandalwood paste (Chandana), or latter two mixed. They apply the material in two vertical lines, which may be connected at the bottom, forming a simple U shape, often with an additional vertical red marking in the shape of a tulsi leaf inside the U shape. Their tilaka is called the Urdhva Pundra. See also Srivaishnava Urdhva Pundra, the Srivaishnava tilaka.
Ganapatya use red sandal paste (rakta candana).
Shaktas use kumkuma, or powdered red turmeric. They draw one vertical line or dot (not to be confused with Bindi used by Indian women from different religions).
Honorary tilakas (Raja tilaka and Vira tilaka are usually applied as a single vertical red line. Raja tilaka will be used while enthroning kings or inviting prominent personalities. Vira tilaka is used to anoint victors or leaders after a war or a game.

Cultural tradition

Jains use Tilaka to mark the forehead of Jaina images with sandalwood paste, during Puja ceremonies.
Hindus use the Tilaka ceremony to welcome guests and show them honour and respect. It may also be used, for same reason, to mark idols at the start of a Puja (worship), to mark a rock or tree before it is cut or removed from its original place for artisan work, or to mark a new piece of property.
Indian Parsis (Zoroastrians) too apply it during their marriage ceremonies.

Types 
The choice of style is not mandated in Hindu texts, and it is left to the individual and the regional culture, leading to many versions. The known styles include Vijayshree – white tilaka urdhwapundra with a white line in the middle, founded by Swami Balanand of Jaipur; Bendi tilaka – white tilak urdhwapundra with a white round mark in the middle, founded by Swami Ramprasad Acharya of Badasthan Ayodhya; and Chaturbhuji tilaka – white tilak urdhwapundra with the upper portion turned 90 degrees in the opposite direction, no shri in the middle, founded by Narayandasji of Bihar, ascetics of Swarg Dwar of Ayodhya follow it. Sharma has named additional styles as, Vallabh Sampraday Tilak, Sri Tilaka of Rewasa Gaddi, Ramacharandas Tilaka, Srijiwarama ka Tilaka, Sri Janakraja Kishori Sharan Rasik Aliji ka Tilaka, Sri Rupkalajee ka Tilaka, Rupsarasji ka Tilaka, Ramasakheeji ka Tilaka, Kamanendu Mani ka Tilaka, Karunasindhuji ka Tilaka, Swaminarayana Tilaka, Nimbarka ka Tilaka and Madhwa ka Tilaka.

In other cultures

Tilak In Jainism: A major Jain population put tilak on their forehead and also Jain women put bindi on their forehead.
Tilak In Sikhism: Sikh gurus are often depicted with a Tilak/dot on their forehead as a mark of enlightenment. 
In Buddhism: Putting tilak is not totally a Buddhist practice during these days but a Tilak does have had a place in Buddhist culture, and many statues of Buddha or related to Buddhism, and tilak can be seen in major paintings and statues of Buddha. Buddhism have philosophies of Chakra that's why there is tilak to represent one of the chakras on statues or Paintings of Buddha.

Relationship to bindi
The terms tilaka and bindi overlap somewhat, but are not synonymous. Among the differences:
A tilaka is always applied with paste or powder, whereas a bindi may be paste or jewel.
A tilaka is usually applied for religious or spiritual reasons, or to honour a personage, event, or victory.  A bindi can signify marriage, or be simply for decorative purposes.

A bindi is worn only between the eyes, whereas a tilaka can also cover the face or other parts of the body. Tilaka can be applied to twelve parts of the body: head, forehead, neck, both upper-arms, both forearms, chest, both sides of the torso, stomach and shoulder.

Terminology

It is also called (তিলক) tilôk, (টিপ) tip or (ফোঁটা)phota in Bengali, tika,  or tilakam or tilak in Hindi;)

In Nepal, Bihar, Uttar Pradesh, and other regions, the tilakam is called a tikā/teeka (टिका ), and is a mixture of sindoor, a red powder, yoghurt, and grains of rice. The most common tilakas are red powder applied with the thumb, or sandalwood (chandan) paste, in a single upward stroke.

See also
Ash Wednesday – a forehead marking tradition in Christianity
Bindi – a cosmetic item of decoration for women in South Asia
Fascinator – a cosmetic item worn near the forehead, an alternative to a hat
Third eye
Tilak (Vaishnava)
Urdhva Pundra Tilak
Vibhuti –  Sacred ash made of burnt wood, burnt cow dung, or from the cremation of bodies.

References

Bibliography

Further reading
 Mittal, Sushil; Thursby, Gene R. (2006). Religions of South Asia: An Introduction. Taylor & Francis, United Kingdom. . pp. 73.

External links

How to put on Tilak, Hare Krishna Temple
Tilaka : Hindu marks on the forehead, Priyabala Shah

Hindu traditions
Objects used in Hindu worship
Hindu symbols
Cosmetics